Nepal participated in the 2002 Asian Games held in Busan, South Korea, from September 29 to October 14, 2002. Athletes from Nepal won overall three medals, all bronzes in the sport of taekwondo, and clinched 32nd spot in the medal table.

Medalists

Athletics

Nepal competed in athletics.

Key
Note–Ranks given for track events are within the athlete's heat only
Q = Qualified for the next round
q = Qualified for the next round as a fastest loser or, in field events, by position without achieving the qualifying target
qR = Qualified to the next round by referee judgement
NR = National record
N/A = Round not applicable for the event
Bye = Athlete not required to compete in round

Track & road events
Men

Field events
Men

Boxing

Nepal competed in boxing.

Men

Golf

Nepal participated in golf.

Men

Judo

Nepal participated in judo.

Men

Karate

Nepal participated in karate.
Men's kumite

Shooting

Nepal participated in shooting.
Men

Women

Soft Tennis

Nepal participated in soft tennis.

Men

Taekwondo

Nepal participated in taekwondo.

Men

Women

Weightlifting

Nepal participated in weightlifting.

Men

Wushu

Nepal participated in wushu.

Men
Sanda

Taijiquan\Taijijian

References

Nations at the 2002 Asian Games
2002
Asian Games